The North Isles are the northern islands of the Shetland Islands, Scotland.  The main islands in the group are Yell, Unst and Fetlar. Sometimes the islands in Yell Sound are included in this group.

Importance 
They are a significant group, since Yell and Unst are the second and third largest islands in the archipelago, and also the third and fourth most populous (Whalsay, which is not in the group, is the second most populous). Combined, their total land area is far larger than the rest of the Shetland Islands (excluding Mainland) combined.

Extreme points 
The group also contains the most northerly land of the United Kingdom and Shetland at Out Stack near Muckle Flugga, and its most northerly settlement Skaw on Unst. These also happen to be the most northerly British territorial claims currently in existence, since Canadian independence. In similar fashion, Britain's most northerly maritime claims are also based on these islands, having great effect on its fishing and oil industries.

Fetlar also contains some of the most easterly points of Scotland with the exception of the Out Skerries, and much of Fetlar and Unst are under 350 km from Norway.

Travellers do not encounter any further land masses between Out Stack and the North Pole if heading directly north.

Other British records include -
 Most northerly castle Muness Castle
 Most northerly post office - formerly Haroldswick now Baltasound
 Most northerly lighthouse - Muckle Flugga
 Most northerly road
 Most northerly brewery - Valhalla Brewery
 Most northerly coastline - Hermanness
 Most northerly church - Haroldswick Methodist Church  
 Most northerly ferry route - Gutcher (Yell) to Belmont (Unst)
 Most northerly "wood" - near Baltasound

Ferries 
The regular ferries are the most northerly scheduled routes in the British Isles (excluding those going to the Faroes and Iceland). They operate between Yell and Unst, Yell and Fetlar and Yell and Mainland.

References 

Landforms of Shetland
Islands of Shetland
Archipelagoes of Scotland